Shoulda Been Home is a 2001 album by blues musician Robert Cray consisting of 12 fresh tracks, seven of them written or co-written by Cray. It was released with Rykodisc Records.

Track listing
All tracks composed by Robert Cray; except where indicated
"Baby's Arms" – 2:55 
"Already Gone" – 6:32 
"Anytime" (Jim Pugh) – 5:26 
"Love Sickness" (Bonnie "Mack" Rice) 2:59 
"I'm Afraid" – 3:11 
"No One Special" – 4:47 
"Out of Eden" (Jim Pugh) – 9:19 
"Cry for Me Baby" (Mel London) – 3:06 
"Far Away" (Cray, S. Turner) – 6:24 
"Renew Blues" (Cray, Jim Pugh, Kevin Hayes, Karl Sevareid) – 1:02 
"Help Me Forget" – 4:18 
"The 12 Year Old Boy" (Mel London) – 2:46

References

2006 albums
Robert Cray albums
Rykodisc albums